Richard Ward (born 17 November 1973) is an English former professional footballer, who played for Notts County and Huddersfield Town.

References

1973 births
Living people
English footballers
Sportspeople from Scarborough, North Yorkshire
Association football midfielders
English Football League players
Notts County F.C. players
Huddersfield Town A.F.C. players
Footballers from North Yorkshire